Akbarabad (also Romanized as Akbarābād and Akberābād; also known as Akbarābād-e Sheshdeh) is a village in Sheshdeh Rural District, Sheshdeh and Qarah Bulaq District, Fasa County, Fars Province, Iran. At the 2006 census, its population was 2,230, in 534 families.

References

Populated places in Fasa County